Freddy Enrique Vargas Piñero (born 1 April 1999) is a Venezuelan professional footballer who plays as a winger for Deportivo Lara.

Club career
Born in Barquisimeto, Vargas made his professional debut for Deportivo Lara on 15 April 2017 in a Primera División match against Trujillanos. He started and played the first half before being substituted during the 1–1 draw. Vargas then scored his first professional career goal on 23 August 2017 in a Copa Venezuela match against Atletico Guanare. He scored the 3rd goal in a 5–0 victory.

FC Dallas (loan)
On 15 January 2021, it was announced that Vargas had joined Major League Soccer side FC Dallas on loan from Deportivo Lara for the 2021 season.

International career
He made his debut for Venezuela national football team on 9 September 2021 in a World Cup qualifier against Paraguay.

Career statistics

Club

References

1991 births
Living people
Sportspeople from Barquisimeto
Venezuelan footballers
Venezuela under-20 international footballers
Venezuela international footballers
Association football forwards
Asociación Civil Deportivo Lara players
FC Dallas players
North Texas SC players
Venezuelan Primera División players
Major League Soccer players
Venezuelan expatriate footballers
Expatriate soccer players in the United States
USL League One players